= Demo disc =

Demo disc could refer to:

- Demo (music) - a recording usually used to try to impress a record label
- Game demo - a trial version of a video game
